The World Military Cup is a football competition for national military teams. It is organized by the International Military Sports Council (CISM). The tournament has been held since 1946 and was originally called the World Military Championship. The name changed for the 2001 edition. When the multi-sport Military World Games was set up in 1995, the football championship was incorporated into it, but it is still being held independently every two years.

A women's tournament, World Military Women's Championship, was started in 2001.

History
The first championship took place in Prague, Czechoslovakia in 1946 under the responsibility of the Armed Forces Sports Council, which in 1948 became the International Military Sports Council (CISM). Great Britain won the first title and Czechoslovakia was the runner-up. In 1995, was created the first Military World Games where football competition take place in this games.

Format
Since 2013, the world championship is divided in 2 different competitions. The CISM World Football Cup is a four years cycle, the 2nd edition of the Cup was played from 15 to 28 January 2017 in Muscat, Oman.

Additionally all 4 years at the Military World Games, football tournament - Military World Championship.

Qualifications
Qualifying tournaments are:

Results

Men

Military World Championship
In 1995 started a football tournament which is a part of the Military World Games every four years. this competition is counted as a part of the world championship.

  A round-robin tournament determined the final standings
  Only three teams in final group
  Tournament held in French Algeria
 * Held as part of the Military World Games

CISM World Football Cup

Teams reaching the top four

Women

  A round-robin tournament determined the final standings
 * Held as part of the Military World Games

Teams reaching the top four

See also
 International Military Sports Council
 Football at the Military World Games
 African Military Cup
 Americas Military Cup

References

External links
RSSSF (men)
RSSSF (women)

 
Football
Non-FIFA football competitions
Military association football competitions
Recurring sporting events established in 1946